The 2013 Manly-Warringah Sea Eagles season is the 64th in the club's history since their entry into the then New South Wales Rugby Football League premiership in 1947. The team finished 4th in the regular season and qualified for the finals where they lost to the Sydney Roosters in the 2013 NRL Grand Final.

Signings/Transfers

Gains

Losses

Ladder

Ladder Progression 

 Numbers highlighted in green indicate that the team finished the round inside the top 8.
 Numbers highlighted in blue indicates the team finished first on the ladder in that round.
 Numbers highlighted in red indicates the team finished last place on the ladder in that round.
 Underlined numbers indicate that the team had a bye during that round.

References 

Manly Warringah Sea Eagles seasons
Manly Warringah Sea Eagles
2013 in rugby league
2013 in rugby league by club